Pelješac is a peninsula in southern Dalmatia in Croatia. The peninsula is part of the Dubrovnik-Neretva County and is the second largest peninsula in Croatia.

Etymology
The name Pelješac is most likely derived from the name of a hill above town of Orebić, which is Pelisac. This is a relatively new name for the peninsula. Throughout history other names have been used, such as Stonski Rat, Puncta Stagni, Ponta di Stagno. and Sabbioncello.

Geography

The Bay of Mali Ston separates the peninsula from the Klek peninsula of Bosnia and Herzegovina and from the Croatian "mainland". The Strait of Pelješac is located at its far western end, and it divides the peninsula from the island of Korčula. In the western part of the peninsula is the highest summit of Pelješac, the Zmijino brdo mountain (lit.

Municipalities

Administratively the peninsula is divided into the municipalities of:
 Orebić in the western part, with 4,165 inhabitants (2001)
 Trpanj in the northwest, with 871 people
 Janjina in the center, 593 people
 Ston in the east, with 2,605 residents

History

Prehistory

The best known archeological site on the peninsula is Nakovana, which has preserved artifacts indicating continuous human settlement over several millennia.

The earliest known historic records of Pelješac are from ancient Greece. The area became part of the Roman province of Dalmatia after the Illyrian Wars (220 BC to 219 BC.). Roman migration soon followed.

Medieval history 
In the 6th century Pelješac came under Byzantine rule.
Upon the arrival of the Slavs, the area from the Neretva river to Rijeka Dubrovačka, and from the northern Herzegovina mountains to the Adriatic coast, new socio-political entities had been established, namely Neretva, Primorje, Travunija and Zahumlje, and ruled by newly risen local nobility. Ston with Rat (then the name for the Pelješac peninsula) and Mljet were under the rule of one of these principalities, namely under the knyazs of Zahumlje. These local rulers acknowledged the supremacy of Byzantium. After Mihajlo Višević, who acknowledged the authority of Bulgarian emperor Simeon, Zahumlje was ruled over by different dynasties. Around 950, it was briefly ruled by Duke Časlav. At the end of the 10th century, Samuilo was the Lord of Zahumlje, and the dukedom belonged to king Ivan Vladimir. In 1168, the Dukedom and Zahumlje were conquered by Raški major prefect Stevan Nemanja. Thirty years later, Zahumlje was invaded by Andrija, the Duke of Croatia and Dalmatia. In 1254, Béla IV of Hungary invaded Bosnia and Zahumlje. From 1304, Zahumlje was ruled by Mladen Šubić, then again for a short period by local župan, and from 1325 by Stjepan II Kotromanić. Republic of Ragusa (Dubrovnik), acquired it from Bosnian rulers in several purchases over several decades, first in 1333 and then on 15 January 1399. King Tvrtko II confirmed purchase of the Bosansko Primorje to Dubrovnik on 24 June 1405.

The old Ston was located on the slopes of the hills of Gorica and St. Michael, south of the Ston field. There were several early Christian churches there, the largest of which was St. Stephen's Church. The bishopric church of Mary Magdalene stood until it was bombed by the Allies in 1944. The only church that still remains is the church of St. Michael, built in the middle of the late antique castrum.

The original old town was demolished in the earthquake of 1252. With the arrival of the Republic, a new city was built on today's location. When renovations were made at the church of St. Michael at the top of the hill, fragments of Roman decorative plaster, Roman tombstones and antique ceramics were found, confirming this assumption. According to some sources, Ston experienced a destructive civil war in 1250, and in these conflicts the city suffered a great deal of destruction.

The turbulent times at the beginning of the 14th century spread across the entire country of Zahumlje. The usurpation by the Branivojević brothers, forced the people of Dubrovnik to fight them in 1326 with the help of Stjepan II Kotromanić. That year, people from Dubrovnik settled Ston, and immediately began to invest and rebuild, and established a new Ston to defend the Pelješac and protect the slaves from which they had earned big revenue. Since the conflict between the Ban in Bosnia and Serbian king, the Dubrovniks purchased Pelješac with Ston from both rulers in 1333.

Modern history
 
At the end of the 12th century Orthodoxy appeared in the Peljesac area, at the same time Catholic bishop is expelled from Ston. Since the end of the 14th century Orthodox priests are no longer on Pelješac.
When the Pelješac peninsula came under rule of Dubrovnik, since 1333 Catholic population predominantly live in this area, with Orthodox Christians and Bogomils present.

The Walls of Ston are large fortifications built by the Republic of Ragusa. They are the second longest walls in Europe. Ston also has one of the oldest salt planes in this part of the world.

The French Empire occupied the region in 1806, abolishing the old Republic, and in 1808 turned it into the Illyrian Provinces. In 1815 it was given to the Austrian Empire and since 1867 became part of the Cisleithania of the Dual Monarchy of Austria-Hungary. Between 1918 and 1941 it was a part Kingdom of Yugoslavia and from 1945 it was part of Socialistic Republic of Croatia within Socialistic Federal Republic of Yugoslavia. From 1991 it is part of Republic of Croatia.

Transport

The D414 road is the longest state road on the peninsula, connecting all municipalities, together with D415 towards Trpanj and D416 towards Prapratno, with county roads in turn connecting Lovište, Žuljana and Hodilje, and a number of local roads to the more remote villages. The Pelješac Bridge located near Brijesta connects the peninsula to the mainland near Komarna, and through it connects the southern semi-exclave of the Dubrovnik-Neretva County with the rest of the country via its territorial waters. It bypasses the narrow strip of coastline at Neum that grants Bosnia and Herzegovina sea access. There are car ferry routes connecting Trpanj to Ploče on the mainland, Orebić to Korčula on the eponymous island, and Prapratno to Sobra on Mljet.

See also
Geography of Croatia
Dalmatia
Dubrovnik-Neretva county
Republic of Ragusa

References

Further reading

External links

http://www.peljesac.info/indexhr.htm
http://www.peljesac.org/

Peninsulas of Croatia
Landforms of Dubrovnik-Neretva County
Adriatic Sea